Crow's Nest is a hill north of So Uk in Cheung Sha Wan of New Kowloon in Hong Kong. It has a height of 194 metres and is located south of Eagle's Nest. It is one of the Eight Mountains of Kowloon.

Lung Cheung Road and Tai Po Road are found on its southern slope. On the eastern side of the hill, there are three private housing estates: Dynasty Heights, Skylodge and Tropicana. Its western slope is mainly given over to cultivation.

See also 
 Geography of Hong Kong
 List of mountains, peaks and hills in Hong Kong
 Eagle's Nest (Hong Kong)
 Beacon Hill Tunnel
 Lion Rock
 MacLehose Trail

References 

Mountains, peaks and hills of Hong Kong
Cheung Sha Wan
New Kowloon